The 2001 Women's Eye Group British Open Squash Championships was held at the Edgbaston Priory Club (qualifying) and the National Indoor Arena in Birmingham from 3–10 June 2001. The event was won by Sarah Fitzgerald who defeated Carol Owens in the final.

Seeds

Draw and results

Qualifying round

First round

Second round

Quarter-finals

Semi-finals

Final

References

Women's British Open Squash Championships
Squash in England
Sports competitions in Birmingham, West Midlands
Women's British Open Squash Championship
2000s in Birmingham, West Midlands
Women's British Open Squash Championship
2001 in women's squash